Amukta Pass is a wide strait between the Bering Sea and the North Pacific Ocean in the Aleutian Islands in Alaska. It lies between Amukta Island to the east and Seguam Island to the west.

Notes

References
Merriam-Webster's Geographical Dictionary, Third Edition. Springfield, Massachusetts: Merriam-Webster, Incorporated, 1997. .

Landforms of the Aleutian Islands
Straits of Aleutians West Census Area, Alaska
Straits of Alaska